NASCO Tours S.A.E is a shipping, travel, and tourism company in Egypt. The company is one of the largest travel and tourism companies in Egypt. NASCO Tours S.A.E also provides transport ranging from land travel to air travel.
And working as a yachting agent to facilitate and manage luxury yachts crossing through Egypt.

History
NASCO SAE was founded in 1948.

References

Travel and holiday companies of Egypt
Egyptian companies established in 1948
Transport companies established in 1948